The Capstan Shafts is the musical project of American lo-fi artist Dean Wells. He has been releasing material under the Capstan Shafts name since 1999, through various indie labels such as Yellow Mica, Asaurus and Abandoned Love Records. Most of his albums are very cheap (four or five dollars) or even free.

His songs are typically short, ranging in length from 45 seconds to 2 minutes, and feature a full-band sound of guitars, bass and drums, all of which are played by Wells himself. Every Capstan Shafts release to date has been recorded at home, giving the music a fuzzy lo-fi sound similar to bands such as Guided By Voices and The Mountain Goats.

Despite a prolific output of recorded material (his total output amounts to ten EPs and seven full-length albums), Wells has only performed live three times. His recent album Her Versus The Sad Cold Eventually, has led to an upsurge in media interest surrounding The Capstan Shafts; the album was given four very favorable reviews on music-news site Pitchfork Media by Matt LeMay of Get Him Eat Him.

Appearances
Dean Wells has also released a song as Vergel Tears, and has three albums under his own name.

On May 2, 2008, Wells opened for The Ruby Suns and Menomena at Middlebury College in Middlebury, VT.  His temporary drummer, never having played live, returned from the bar just in time as Dean was about to be forced to start without him.

In 2010 the Capstan Shafts regrouped as a 5 piece band before playing shows across the U.S. east coast.  Festivals dates at SXSW and CMJ followed before the band released their first studio LP "Revelation Skirts" for Rainbow Quartz Records.

Recently, National Public Radio chose the Capstan Shafts as one of "5 Artists You Should Have Known in 2010".

Discography
"'Revelation Skirts'" (2010) Rainbow Quartz Records
Fairwater Triumpalist
Let Your Head Get Wrong
Little Burst of Sunshine
Versus the Sad Cold Eventually
Class War Tease
Heart Your Eat Out
Successfully Into You
From Revelation Skirts
Quiet Wars
Your Wasted is a Talent Here
Cruel Streak Andes
Versus the World-Hater
Miss Stelliferous
Great Reset Button of Life

Fixation Protocols (2008)
Rainbow Quartz Records

 Asymptonic Freedom
 Shaky Days, Bring Honey
 Eyeliner Skywriting etc.
 Middles of June
 Anthropecene Stealers
 Miss Cenozoic
 What Used to Become You (Now Befalls You)
 Communists in 19th Century America
 A Heart That Never Flies
 Get Honest
 Brightest Page in the History of Man
 Her Novel 'Canal Zone Poetry'
 Little World Saver
 Boy to Take You Nowhere
 Behemoth to a Flame
 The Hell With the Days Again
 The Stunted Kind
 Fixation Protocol
 Squeals of Resignation
 Song for Monometallists
 The Framers Blameless Enterprise
 Voting Hopeless

Miles Per Famine (2008)
self-released

 Main title miles per famine
 Perspective versus Evelyn
 (I dream about you because) you have such low standards
 Lemondrop hamstrung
 Contrary’s mom
 Trick years
 Second the devils esplanade
 The complete history of Ruth, Nevada
 Ethanol its cracked up to be
 Evelyn Halfstep?
 Hippolyte my life
 End title miles per famine

Environ Maiden (2007)
Rainbow Quartz Records

 Right on the Malthus
 Flip Cup Casualties
 The Dig Perpetual
 My Family Was Welsh, I'm Just Tired
 Sincere as a Windchime
 The Origin of Rain
 Trouble Peddling
 The Giving Earth and Her Oils of Love
 Girl to Scoff World's Ills
 The Ballad of Kid Butane
 The Complete History of Greenland
 Drop Dead Innocuous
 Vegans and Meteors
 Disko Bay (Good Years Left)
 Elected Head of Her Anarchist Group
 One of Us Should Be Further Away
 Hip to the Sweet Blue World Again
 Low Ceilings for Bedhoppers
 Oil Over Greenland! (Morsels of Fortitude)
 The Devil's Gazebo
 Favorite Eco-Terrorist
 Snakeskin Belt Through Loose Hoops
 She's Kick People
 The Flowering Universe Confounds
 Phase Appraisals
 Sick of Green
 Days from Work
 Better Get a Dream out of This
 Northern Me!

Bug Tragic (2007)
Archive.org
 Thinking Done
 The Devil's Esplanade
 Moving Wrong
 Better Ways to Hang
 Arthouse Floozy
 Smoking Window Closed
 Sad the Gains of Statists
 A Senator Short of a Quorum
 Abomination Paint

A Brace for Hephaestus (2007)
Archive.org

 Going by Martian Years Now
 The Icecaps of Mars (Are Just Copying Ours)
 More Faults than the Tharsis Region
 Tart Collaborative
 Grapples and Orangutangs
 She's Kick People
 Second Porches Can be Closer to Mars

Kid Butane Goes to Greenland (2007)
Archive.org

 The Ballad of Kid Butane
 The Complete History of Greenland
 Drop Dead Innocuous
 Elected Head Of Her Anarchist Group
 One Of Us Should Be Further Away
 They Call Me Kid Butane
 The Giving Earth and Her Oils of Love

Consumption Violets (2007)
Archive.org

 Flip Cup Casualties
 Right On The Malthus
 The Dig Perpetual
 Death To The Martyrs
 Low Ceilings For Bedhoppers
 Champions Of Equanimity
 Tackle Factory

Dreamilys Throttled Revolts (2007)
Fall of the West Records

 Half a Bottle and a Full Moon
 One World Government (is One Too Many)
 Your Wasteds are a Talent Here
 Sap for Clearcut
 The Better She Looks the Less She Will See
 Playing Doctrine
 Gravitational Pollster
 Quiet Wars
 Clammy Handed Favors
 She Makes Amazing Look Stupid
 When Gold Brick Twins
 Mosquito Net Worth
 Hopeful Grows the Molehill
 Dreamily Very Later
 Trickier the Wisdom
 Skirt Inversions
 Cool Green Sinkings
 Consumption Violets
 Interdiction Hips
 Box Store Apologist
 Abandoned Drum Circles
 ....and a Patriot's Lament

Her Versus the Sad Cold Eventually (2007)
Asaurus (website)

 Wilds of Gloryville
 Kiss-You Advocacy
 “Lauren Behold” (A Discussion with a Stripper over Canadian Style Health Care)
 Can’t you tell a Slow Burn Woo When you Ignore One?
 He would Die for you (If it Were up to me)
 Bluejean V. Debs
 How Could China Fail?
 I Don’t Like the Movies
 If She Quivers?
 She Can’t Stand the Quiet (Unless it’s Me Shutting Up)
 Hearts to the Fore, We Storm Love Castles
 Your Alone Has so Many More People in It
 Pick your Dystopia
 The Trilateralist Told You not To
 Every Dog Has its Silver Lining
 Red Scarcity
 Goner Alaskas
 Saddlebags and the Age of Jesus
 The Onetime Milwaukee Suicide
 Proletariat Glow

The Megafauna Undermined (2006)
SCTAS

 More Lovely than Likely
 Big Oil Hackery
 Save My Down for a Sadder Day
 Tanning Wrong
 My Family Was Welsh. I’m Just Tired
 Old Skull, New Mexico
 Quarantine Lifter
 Hairtrigger Recess Appointment
 Sincere as a Windchime
 Finer Supercathedrals
 Catch you Next Divorce
 The Lightning Boy
 No Threat of a Good Time
 Suckers of Twiddled Thumbs
 The Worst Lessons from the Wrong People
 Handstander in an Age of Backflips
 The Complete History of England
 Goodlie Oddthoughts Journal of Woe
 Hit me Like the Greatest Car Song

Euridice Proudhon (2006)
Kittridge

 Everyone Plants Trees
 Sleepcure Theory Advancer
 Carbon Neutral Enterprise
 Orpheus in His Underware
 Signature Car Funk
 The Small of the Back the Crimewave
 Magical Dance Number Scene
 61 Sideburns
 Gods Favorite Foreigner
 Most Cultures Were Wrong
 Use the Poets as Barricades
 Aching Tiny Everywheres
 I Don’t Mind you Dragging Me Down
 The Failure of History
 Sunshine Profligate
 Our Southern Ambitions
 Defenstration Makes Good Neighbors
 Polyestershines
 American Volume
 Griefseedling
 Good Riddence, Euridice
 Hip/Misguided

Springboard to the Boxwine Set (2006)
Yellow Mica

 Slow Day for Reasoning
 The Deli Girls Give me what I Ask for if I Am Careful What I Ask for
 Trouble to Shave
 They Call me the Etruskan Musket
 Tilting at Windchills
 Jackie Relief Map
 The Laziest Gypsies
 Cavacade of Sulk
 Sonny and Cher
 Failed Budhist Retreat Come-On
 God is in my Bitchseat
 Sealed with a Kiss, Opened with a Crowbar
 Dumb Bastard Parade
 Sideagle and Supereagle
 Half of the Toys
 The Great Instead
 The Wives of Halloween Whiskers
 Among the Many Things Pinned to you Are my Hopes
 The Crime at the Anchorage Marina
 Show me your Sunshine
 Some Birds Soaring, Some Roasting
 Tombstone in the Poor Choice Graveyard
 Boxwine Willies
 Beach Delay, or Lighten up, Fuzzhead

The Sun Don’t Get Things Done (2006)
Ladder the Christmas Monkey Records

 Hearthrobgoblins
 Lower Costa Rica
 She Sees the Good in Everyone
 Several Dozen Engines
 Don’t Let the Motorcyclists
 Avoiding Daddys on the Floor

The Sleeved and Granddaughters of the Black List (2005)
Abandoned Love Records

 St. Paul?
 Can’t Climb a Tree (without Breaking a few Branches)
 A Gal Called Allegory
 Live Nudebranches
 Wonderful Lottery Ticket Way
 Sister Artworld Frenzy
 Grindcore Tribals
 Recovering Cheerleader, Recovering Greenpeace Canvasser
 Groovy your World View
 Here Comes Down
 Hominid Stickler
 Brush Cleaning Boy
 Testy and Half-Baked
 Chandelier of Bad Ideas
 Fates Hammer, Hollows and Powderkegs
 Leftcoast Intolerant
 “Cheery Magdelene”
 Whatever, I’m a Miracle
 A Bad Childhood and the Commerce Clause
 She Paints with Both Hands

Halaluah Moancoaxers (2005)
Beat the Indie Drum

 Love Pundits Bright Future
 Lessthreatening Day
 Petals on an Austin Rose
 Personals Surfer
 Sarasota vs. the Concrete Poets
 The Strategy of Daylight
 The Giddy Tramps Marching Orders
 Your Hipper Default Settings

Demon Dog of the American Park Service (2005)
Yellow Mica

 Drunken Eagles West Coast Bash
 Get your Cat out of my Sunbeam
 Lucky Monkey Briefs
 Kinder Springs
 Gone City Knock Out
 Negative Man, What’s the Anti Matter?
 93 Approximately
 Take your Coat off and Stomp for a While
 Carrier State Anthems
 Light as Mantra

The Night Shrine of Well-Groomed Lawns (2005)
Ladder the Christmas Monkey Records

 The Gourgestest of Glorious Suns
 Good Mood Passes
 Tape-Opera
 Get Needy on Me
 Barnacle Geese
 Sometimes the Horns
 Particularly Mindsticking
 No Downer for the Skein

Unreconstructed Lo-fi Whore (2005)
Ladder the Christmas Monkey Records

 The Days Don’t Pass in Wonder
 Half-Drunk and Assless
 Landfill Dancers
 Anniversaries of Genodices
 Cuddleparty Renegade
 World-Hater Company Song

Her Chapbook Called “Tiny Grey Radio” (2004)
Ladder the Christmas Monkey Records

 Upstairs with the Anti-Christ
 Perfect Bound Someday
 Gift of Higher Aspirations
 Pome on Pg. 14
 She Reads Easy
 Tulipsqueaking
 Scripted Ass Collisions

Ample Tribes for Sullen King Pounder (2004)
Ladder the Christmas Monkey Records

 Posters for Cat Disappeared
 Dukes of the Ugly Sound
 No. 5 Aluminum Lake
 Alien Like Paraguay
 She’s the Moon Hoax
 Feed me Flowers

Hopegetswheels (2004)
Ladder the Christmas Monkey Records

 Hibiscus Wildzoo Pt. II
 Little Burst of Sunshine
 Shimmyshake on Monster Islan
 Dinosaurs to Drive Off
 Fireman Among the Eskimos
 Hibiscus Wildzoo Pt. I

Seal Cull Rebellion (2004)
Ladder the Christmas Monkey Records

 Birthdays and Middlenames
 Drags of Grind
 Datepanties
 Sacrificial Anode Rod
 Favorite Enabler
 Camel Lightyears

Great Reset Button of Life (2004)
Ladder the Christmas Monkey Records

 Virgin Queen of the Cattlemen
 The Tragedy of Empiricism
 Crownchafings
 All Your Little Happenings
 Some Good Factory Ass
 Blue Foreign Cartoons

Chick Cigarettes (2004)
Asaurus (website)

 Good Judge of Witch Flesh
 The Day you Called me Pretty
 Auto Naval
 Ogre Finds
 Vulture Juice
 Qualms of the Azor Bombers
 Gentler Trending
 Cornflower Blues
 Froth of July
 The Battle of Metaphor
 Goddess of Provisional Affinity
 Felony War
 Shiny New Chain
 Too Much Shit (and not enough Ass)
 Dying Sun
 My Beautiful Days
 Sweet Lady of the Calmatives
 Good Morning, Please
 Revenge Sex Theater
 My Gal Lo

Some Creatures Have No Experts (?)

 In Favor of the Trees
 Felony Wear
 Three Beer Drama
 Precious Dimple Refinement
 To the Dreamy Pop Icons
 Alien Hand
 Five Reasons for Moonshots

External links
 Unofficial Myspace page with many useful links and info
 Last FM profile of The Capstan Shafts
 Interview with Dean Wells
 Crawdaddy! Profile, The Capstan Shafts, There's Blood On The Four-Track
 Pitchfork Media review of three Capstan Shafts albums
 Pitchfork Media review of Environ Maiden
 NPR's 5 Artists You Should Have Known in 2010

American indie rock groups